The Wedding Tackle is a 2000 British comedy film directed by Rami Dvir and starring Leslie Grantham, Tony Slattery, Adrian Dunbar, Amanda Redman, Susan Vidler, and James Purefoy.

Plot
Hal, an over sexed photographer, has a problem. He is due to marry Vinni in one weeks time and he's got cold feet. In fact, he's got frostbite. His friend, Little Ted, a scheming, sexually frustrated cartoonist is obsessed with Vinni, even though he dumped her when they went out together. Both Little Ted and Hal have their own plans to disrupt the imminent wedding and they separately call upon Mr.Mac, a world weary swimming coach, to help them out. On Hal's all day stag night, Little Ted sets in motion a disastrous chain of events when he persuades Mr.Mac to convince Petula, (his ex-girlfriend) to seduce Hal in a pub lavatory so that he can record it on Polaroid. Hal, decides to chat up Caroline Lynch in The All Bar One pub in London.  Hal falls so hopelessly in love with Caroline he takes her out to dinner to a posh restaurant in London. Hal uses all of his charm on Caroline to make him fall in love with him.

Soundtrack
The soundtrack to The Wedding Tackle

"I Close My Eyes and Count to Ten" - Performed by Dusty Springfield
"Girl Don't Come" - Performed by Sandie Shaw
"Something Tells Me (Something's Gonna Happen Tonight)" - Performed by Cilla Black
"You've Got Your Troubles" -  Performed by The Fortunes
"Walkin' Back to Happiness" - Performed by Helen Shapiro
"Long Live Love" - Performed by Sandie Shaw
"Where Do You Go To (My Lovely)" - Performed by Peter Sarstedt
"You Were Made for Me" - Performed by Freddie & The Dreamers
"Lightnin' Strikes" - Performed by Lou Christie
"Lovesick Blues" - Performed by Frank Ifield
"Bobby's Girl" - Performed by Susan Maughan
"Dance On" - Performed by Kathy Kirby
"The Letter" - Performed by The Box Tops
"I'm a Tiger" - Performed by Lulu
"You Don't Have to Say You Love Me" - Performed by Dusty Springfield
"Puppet on a String" - Performed by Sandie Shaw
"Boom Bang-a-Bang" - Performed by Lulu

External links

 

2000 films
2000 comedy films
British comedy films
2000s English-language films
2000s British films